Galina Savitskaya (born 13 July 1961) is a Belarusian former basketball player, born in Minsk, who competed in the 1988 Summer Olympics.

References

1961 births
Living people
Basketball players from Minsk
Belarusian women's basketball players
Belarusian expatriate basketball people in Spain
Olympic basketball players of the Soviet Union
Basketball players at the 1988 Summer Olympics
Olympic bronze medalists for the Soviet Union
Olympic medalists in basketball
Soviet women's basketball players
Soviet expatriate sportspeople in Spain
Medalists at the 1988 Summer Olympics
Honoured Masters of Sport of the USSR